The Weald and Downland Gridshell (2002) is a building designed by Buro Happold and Edward Cullinan Architects for the Weald and Downland Open Air Museum: it was shortlisted for the Stirling Prize in 2002. The building is a structural wooden gridshell, constructed of oak sourced from Normandy. Before constructing the gridshell, members of Buro Happold and the Cullinan practice-built a prototype during their own time on weekends. This was also a self-supporting gridshell, and was used as a temporary entrance canopy on the Pompidou Centre.

Awards
The project has won the following awards:
 RIBA Regional Architecture Award 2002.
 Runner-up for the RIBA Stirling Prize 2003.
 IStructE David Alsop Commendation 2003.
 British Construction Industry Awards 2002.  Winner of the Small Project category.
 American Institute of Architects, Excellence in Design Award 2003.
 Civic Trust Award for outstanding contribution to the quality and appearance of the environment.
 Sussex Heritage Trust 2003.  Winner Commercial and Industrial Category.
 Wood Awards 2003.  Gold Award Winner.
 Wood Awards 2003.  Structural Category Winner.
 European Wood Facade Contest Award given by the Nordic Timber Council.

References

External links

Weald and Downland Website

Buildings and structures in West Sussex
Buildings and structures completed in 2002
2002 establishments in England